Vukašin Mandrapa (died 1942/43) is a saint and a martyr of the Serbian Orthodox Church canonized as Saint Vukašin of Klepci (Свети Вукашин из Клепаца).

His surname and place of birth are disputed. Several sources claim his surname was actually Toholj, and some claim he was from the village of Lokve and not Klepci. Ustashas killed him probably in August 1942. The years of his death is also disputed, as either 1942 or 1943. According to one story, Vukašin was a farmer and merchant, born in Klepci. According to historian Ivo Rendić-Miočević there is no historical evidence of its existence.

He and his family lived in Sarajevo and then returned to Klepci, but were arrested and sent to the Independent State of Croatia's Jasenovac death camp. Mandrapa was listed among the victims of Jasenovac in 2007 by the Serbian Fond for the Research of Genocide in Jasenovac.

According to testimony given in 1970 by neuropsychiatrist Nede Zec who was detained in Jasenovac, Mandrapa was singled out by a Croatian Ustaše, surnamed Friganović (first name Josip or Mile), who had observed his stoic behavior during the forced labor days and the slaughter of prisoners at night. During one night when prison guards made bets as to who could slaughter the most inmates, Friganović allegedly attempted to compel Mandrapa to bless the Ustaše leader Ante Pavelić. Mandrapa refused to do, even after Friganović had allegedly cut off both his ears and nose after each refusal.

"And when I ordered him for the fourth time to shout "Long live Pavelić!" and threatened to take his heart out with a knife, he looked at me, and by somehow looking through me and over me into uncertainty, he slowly and clearly said "just [you] do your job, child."

The executor then allegedly cut out Mandrapa's eyes, tore out his heart, and slashed his throat.

References

External links
 Biography on Jasenovac info website 
 

Mandrapa, Vukasin
1940s deaths
Date of death missing
Year of birth missing
20th-century Eastern Orthodox martyrs
People from Čapljina
New Martyrs
Persecution of Serbs
People executed by the Independent State of Croatia
People murdered in the Independent State of Croatia
Serb people who died in the Holocaust
Yugoslav people who died in the Holocaust
Bosnia and Herzegovina civilians killed in World War II
Deaths by blade weapons

People who died in Jasenovac concentration camp
Serbs of Bosnia and Herzegovina